Gennady Valeryevich Zhidko (born 12 September 1965) is a colonel general of the Russian Armed Forces. He was awarded the title Hero of the Russian Federation in 2017 for his service as chief of staff of Russian forces deployed to Syria. Following this assignment, Zhidko commanded the Eastern Military District and headed the Main Military-Political Directorate of the Russian Armed Forces. In late May 2022, it was reported that Zhidko had been put in charge of Russian forces during the 2022 Russian invasion of Ukraine, replacing Army General Aleksandr Dvornikov. In 8 October 2022, he was replaced by Army General Sergey Surovikin as the new commander of the Russian forces in Ukraine.

Early life and education 

Gennady Zhidko was born on 12 September 1965 in the village of Yangiabad in the Uzbek Soviet Socialist Republic.

Graduating from the Tashkent Higher Tank Command School in 1987, Zhidko became a platoon commander in the 27th Guards Motor Rifle Division.

Career

Volga-Ural Military District (1987-1997)
During Zhidko's service with the 27th Guards Motor Rifle Division, part of the Volga and Volga-Ural Military Districts at Totskoye, Orenburg Oblast, Zhidko rose to divizion (artillery battalion) commander, was promoted to captain early, and then to colonel. He received awards for organizing fire training from the commander of the Ural Military District, Colonel-General Alexander Baranov.

In 1997, Zhidko graduated from the Malinovsky Military Armored Forces Academy.

Tajikistan (2001)
Zhidko served as commander of the 92nd Motor Rifle Regiment of the 201st Motor Rifle Division in Dushanbe, Tajikistan in 2001.

College of the General Staff (2007)
In 2007, Zhidko graduated from the Military Academy of the General Staff.

North Caucasian Military District (2007-2009)
From August 2007 to July 2009, Zhidko was commander of the 20th Guards Motor Rifle Division of the North Caucasian Military District, based in Volgograd.  During his tenure in this post, he continued the work of Major General Aleskandr Lapin to establish trusting relationships with military groups, improve combat and technical training. He also oversaw the beginning of the transition of the division from conscripts to contract servicemen.

Western Military District (2009-2011)
From July 2009 to January 2011, he was the Deputy Commander of the 20th Guards Combined Arms Army of the Moscow, then Western Military Districts with headquarters in Voronezh. From January 2011 to January 2012 - Chief of Staff - First Deputy Commander of the 6th Combined Arms Army of the Western Military District, based in Saint Petersburg. He participated in the formation of this unit, for his organizational skills he was noted by the commander of the 6th Army, Major General Yevgeny Ustinov, with the Commander of the Western Military District, Colonel-General Arkady Bakhin.

Central Military District (2015-2017)
From January 2015 to September 2016, he was Chief of Staff - First Deputy Commander of the 2nd Guards Combined Arms Army, and from September 2016 to November 2017 - Commander of the 2nd Guards Combined Arms Army of the Central Military District with headquarters in Samara. During the Zapad-2017 military exercises, the army units were quickly deployed from Samara to the Kola Peninsula.

On 20 February 2016, he was promoted to the rank of major general.

In December 2017, Major General Rustam Muradov took over as commander of the 2nd Combined Arms Army. A participant in the Russian military intervention in Syria, in 2016, Zhidko served as chief of staff of the group of the Armed Forces of the Russian Federation in Syria.

Moscow command structure (2017-2018)
From 22 November 2017 to 3 November 2018, he was the Deputy Chief of the General Staff of the Russian Armed Forces.

On 11 June 2018, he was promoted to the rank of lieutenant general.

Eastern Military District (2018-2021)
In November 2018, Zhidko was appointed commander of the Eastern Military District, replacing Alexander Zhuravlyov, who had transferred to the post of commander of the Western Military District, on 13 November, he was presented to the leadership at the district headquarters in Khabarovsk.

On 11 June 2020, Zhidko was promoted to colonel general.

Moscow command structure (2021-2022)
On 12 November 2021, Zhidko was appointed head of the Main Military-Political Directorate of the Russian Armed Forces (GVPU), a position included among the deputy ministers of defence. Zhidko replaced Andrey Kartapolov, who had retired from the army. On 28 July 2022, Colonel General Viktor Goremykin replaced him as head of the GVPU.

Russo Ukrainian war (2022-present)
On 26 May 2022, the Conflict Intelligence Team, citing Russian soldiers, reported that Zhidko had been put in charge of Russian forces during the 2022 Russian invasion of Ukraine, replacing Army General Aleksandr Dvornikov. On June 22, 2022, The Guardian reported that during a visit to Ukraine by Russian defence minister Sergei Shoigu, “footage appeared to confirm that the colonel general Gennady Zhidko is now commanding troops in Ukraine.”  Having assumed the position in May, Zhidko was demoted a month later to head of the Eastern Military District, and Sergey Surovikin was publicly announced to have taken the position on October 8.

Sanctions
Zhidko was included under US sanctions in July 2022.

References

1965 births
Living people
Russian colonel generals
Heroes of the Russian Federation
People from Sirdaryo Region
Recipients of the Order "For Merit to the Fatherland", 4th class
Recipients of the Order of Military Merit (Russia)
Recipients of the Medal of the Order "For Merit to the Fatherland" II class
Specially Designated Nationals and Blocked Persons List
Military Academy of the General Staff of the Armed Forces of Russia alumni
Deputy Defence Ministers of Russia
Russian military personnel of the 2022 Russian invasion of Ukraine